Tamás Molnár (born 23 July 1968 in Nyíregyháza) is a Hungarian former sprinter who competed primarily in the 400 metres. He represented his country at the 1992 Summer Olympics as well as two World Championships. In addition, he won a bronze medal at the 1987 European Junior Championships.

International competitions

Personal bests
Outdoor
100 metres – 10.72 (+1.6 m/s, Budapest 1985)
200 metres – 20.64 (-1.2 m/s, Norman 1990)
400 metres – 45.44 (Durham 1990)
Indoor
60 metres – 7.10 (Budapest 1985)
200 metres – 21.24 (Budapest 1988)
400 metres – 46.37 (Lincoln 1990)

References

All-Athletics profile

1968 births
Living people
Hungarian male sprinters
Olympic athletes of Hungary
Athletes (track and field) at the 1992 Summer Olympics
People from Nyíregyháza
Sportspeople from Szabolcs-Szatmár-Bereg County